Keith B. Saunders (16 February 1934 – 18 November 2003) was an indigenous Australian professional boxer and author of two books.

Early life
Keith Saunders was born in South Cardiff, New South Wales on 16 February 1934 to Mary and Sidney Saunders.  When he was ten years old his family moved to Redfern in Sydney.

Professional career
Throughout his working life Saunders held a variety of jobs including laborer, truck driver, garbage collector and roller driver as well as experiencing periods of unemployment.

Boxing
Keith Saunders was spotted as a young teenager by Billy McConnell the owner of a gymnasium. He had his first amateur fight at the age of 13. Three years later he made it to the New South Wales State Amateur Boxing Finals.

He became a welterweight fighter and began fighting professionally in 1952. During training Keith served as a sparring partner for some of the world's best boxers. He experienced racism throughout his boxing career.  He travelled to New Zealand in 1959 to compete against Samoan boxer Tuna Scanlan.

He retired from boxing in 1966 but made two comebacks in 1968 at the age of 32 and again in 1970 before retiring permanently.

Writing
Keith Saunders was awarded a grant of $2,273 in 1987 to write his biography. The book explored his boxing career "in the context of his personal history and the social and economic conditions of the period." Although he planned to have a ghost writer write his biography, after three failed attempts he wrote the book himself and it was published by Aboriginal Studies Press. He was interviewed by Heather Rusden when his first book the autobiography Learning the Ropes was released. In the interview he discusses his personal experiences of racism as an Aboriginal Australian.  In the book, he describes how the Aborigines Protection Act 1909 in Australia regulated "most aspects of the lives of Aborigines".

His second book Myall Road focussed on life in Sydney in the 1950s and 1960s.

Works

References

1934 births
2003 deaths
Australian male boxers
Welterweight boxers
Indigenous Australian boxers
Indigenous Australian writers